Richard Melvyn Sutton (born 21 August 1965 in Gravesend, Kent) is an English former professional footballer who played in the Football League, as a central defender.

References

Sources
Profile at Neil Brown

1965 births
Living people
Sportspeople from Gravesend, Kent
English footballers
Association football defenders
Norwich City F.C. players
Dagenham F.C. players
Peterborough United F.C. players
English Football League players